Euura salicispurpureae is a species of sawfly belonging to the family Tenthredinidae (common sawflies). It was first described by Jens-Peter Kopelke in 2014. The larvae feed within galls on willows (Salix species). E. salicispurpureae is one of a number of closely related species known as the Euura atra subgroup.

Description
The larva probably over-winter in the gall.

Galls have been recorded on S. purpurea, S. purpurea x silesiaca and S. purpurea x viminalis.

Other similar looking species in the Euura atra subgroup are,
 E. atra  found on white willow (Salix alba) and crack willow (S. fragilis). 
 E. auritae, found on eared willow (S. aurita)
 E. myrtilloides found on swamp willow (S. myrtilloides)
 E. weiffenbachiella, found on creeping willow (S. repens) and S. rosmarinifolia

Distribution
Euura salicispurpureae has been recorded from north Africa, and south and central Europe, north to Denmark. According to Redfern et al.(2011) the gall has been recorded in Ireland as E purpureae.

References

Tenthredinidae
Gall-inducing insects
Hymenoptera of Africa
Hymenoptera of Europe
Insects described in 2014
Taxa named by Jens-Peter Kopelke
Willow galls